Lachnocnema brimoides is a butterfly in the family Lycaenidae. It is found in western Tanzania, Malawi (Mount Mlanje), Zambia, the eastern highlands of Zimbabwe and Mozambique.

References

Butterflies described in 1996
Taxa named by Michel Libert
Miletinae